Frits Evert Eijken (30 June 1893 – 6 June 1978) was a Dutch rower. He competed at the 1920 Summer Olympics in the single sculls, but failed to reach the final. In 1921, Eijken won the Diamond Challenge Sculls at Henley Royal Regatta  beating Jack Beresford  in the final.  Following Eijken's victory, Janus Ooms passed on to him the "Golden Belt" he was awarded in 1892. Eijken, in turn, passed it on to the next Dutch Diamonds winner  Bert Gunther in 1929.

References

1893 births
1978 deaths
Dutch male rowers
Olympic rowers of the Netherlands
Rowers at the 1920 Summer Olympics
Delft University of Technology alumni
People from Batavia, Dutch East Indies
European Rowing Championships medalists